William McLaughlin may refer to:

 Bill McLaughlin  Australian rugby union player
 Billy McLaughlin, American musician
 Willie McLaughlin (1878–1946), Scottish footballer
 William McLaughlin (baseball) (1861–1936), Major League Baseball shortstop
 William McLaughlin (politician) (born 1932), American politician from Michigan
 William I. McLaughlin (born 1935), retired American space scientist